The Arjuna Award, officially known as the Arjuna Awards for Outstanding Performance in Sports and Games, is the sports honour of the Republic of India.It is awarded annually by the Ministry of Youth Affairs and Sports. Before the introduction of the Rajiv Gandhi Khel Ratna in 1991–1992, the Arjuna award was the highest sporting honour of India.

Name
The award is named after Arjuna, a character from the Sanskrit epic Mahabharata of ancient India. He is one of the Pandavas, depicted as a skilled archer winning the hand of Draupadi in marriage and in the Kurukshetra War, Lord Krishna becomes his charioteer teaching him the sacred knowledge of Gita. In Hindu mythology, he has been seen as a symbol of hard work, dedication and concentration.

History
Instituted in 1961 to honour the outstanding sportspersons of the country, the award over the years has undergone a number of expansions, reviews, and rationalizations. The award was expanded to include all the recognised disciplines in 1977, has introduced indigenous games and physically handicapped categories in 1995 and introduced a lifetime contribution category in 1995 leading to creation of a separate Dhyan Chand Award in 2002. The latest revision in 2018 stipulates that the award is given only to the disciplines included in the events like Olympic Games, Paralympic Games, Asian Games, Commonwealth Games, World Championship and World Cup along with Cricket, Indigenous Games, and Parasports. It also recommends giving only fifteen awards in a year, relaxing in case of excellent performance in major multi-sport events, team sports, across gender and giving away of at least one award to physically challenged category.

The nominations for the award are received from all government-recognised National Sports Federations, the Indian Olympic Association, the Sports Authority of India (SAI), the Sports Promotion and Control Boards, the state and the union territory governments and the Rajiv Gandhi Khel Ratna, Arjuna, Dhyan Chand and Dronacharya awardees of the previous years. The recipients are selected by a committee constituted by the Ministry and are honoured for their "good performance in the field of sports over a period of four years" at international level and for having shown "qualities of leadership, sportsmanship and a sense of discipline".

Recipients
A total of 147 awards were presented in the 1990s thirteen in 1990, followed by eight in 1991, seven in 1992, ten in 1993, eight in 1994, nine in 1995, eighteen in 1996, twenty-one in 1997, thirty in 1998 and twenty-three in 1999. Individuals from twenty-nine different sports were awarded, which includes twenty-one from hockey, twenty from athletics, eleven from kabaddi, nine each from boxing, cricket, shooting and weightlifting, eight from wrestling, four each from badminton, golf, judo, lawn tennis, rowing, swimming and yachting, three each from table tennis and volleyball, two each from archery, football and squash, and one each from basketball, billiards & snooker, bodybuilding, carrom, chess, equestrian, gymnastics, kho kho and powerlifting. 

Amongst the notable winners was Leander Paes (awarded in 1990), considered one of the greatest doubles players in tennis history. He won eight Grand Slam doubles titles and ten Grand Slam mixed doubles titles. He also won the bronze medal in men's single tennis at 1996 Atlanta Olympic Games, being the first Indian individual medal winner at Olympics since 1952. Cricket legend Sachin Tendulkar (awarded in 1994), considered one of the greatest batsmen of all time according to the Encyclopedia Britannica, was the first cricketer to score 100 centuries in international competition. He is also the highest run scorer of all time in International cricket and the first sportsperson to be awarded the Bharat Ratna, India's highest civilian award in 2014. Dhanraj Pillay (awarded in 1995), was a field hockey player and the captain of the India national team. He is regarded as one of best Indian players of all times, having made three hundred and thirty-nine appearances for the national team and having scored a hundred and seventy goals. Another cricketer Rahul Dravid (awarded in 1998), nicknamed The Wall for "the sense of permanence to be found in his batting", is the fourth highest run-scorer in Test cricket and is considered one of the greatest batsmen of all time.

List of recipients

Explanatory notes

Reference

External links
Official website

 
Indian sports trophies and awards
Lists of Indian award winners